We Will Shoot Back: Armed Resistance in the Mississippi Freedom Movement is a non-fiction book written by Akinyele Umoja, an American author and educator. It was published in April 2013 by the New York University Press.

A review in The Clarion-Ledger in 2015 described the book as following "confrontations in communities across the state through the end of the 1970s, demonstrating how black Mississippians were ultimately able to overcome intimidation by mainstream society, defeat legal segregation, and claim a measure of political control of their state." The author was honored for the book in 2014 in Oakland.

Reviews

References

External links
Website by the publisher
 Muhammad Speaks Interviews Dr. Akinyele Umoja, Part 1
 CNN interview with Dr. Akinyele Umoja
 We Will Shoot Back on “Left of Black“
 We Will Shoot Back at Cornell University
 We Will Shoot Back at the Carruther Center for Inner City Studies
 Akinyele Umoja talks about We Will Shoot Back

2013 non-fiction books
Books about African-American history
New York University Press books
1970s in Mississippi